Troo (also: Trôo) is a commune of the Loir-et-Cher department in central France.

Population

Sights
The village, which is partly troglodytic, consisting of cave-dwellings, is dominated by the collégiale or Saint Martin's church. It overlooks the small church of Saint-Jacques-des-Guérets, known for its Romanesque wall paintings.

See also
Communes of the Loir-et-Cher department

References

Communes of Loir-et-Cher